Caroline Sarah Karam (Arabic:كارولينا كرم) is a French and Lebanese singer and dancer. She was born on November 3, 1986, in Pointe à Pitre in France. She made her debut after winning the Lebanese Latin Championship in 2011.

Early life and education
Carolina Karam was born in Point a Pitre, Guadeloupe, France to French Lebanese Catholic Parents, where she grew up and stayed until the age of 7, before returning to Lebanon. Her passion for music started at a young age influenced by her mother Venus Karam who is a singer and a guitarist mostly singing Christian songs in churches.
From 2005 to 2009, Karam studied at Notre Dame University–Louaize, in Lebanon, where she majored in nutrition. She speaks four languages fluently French, Arabic, English, and Spanish.

Career 
Karam is a member of the Syndicate of Professional Artists in Lebanon. After winning the Lebanese Latin Championship  and the Lebanese Latin Cup in 2011, she represented her country in various dance competitions worldwide. Karam participated in the TV show-Arabic version Dancing with the Stars for 2 consecutive years.

Karam sang in the television program Celebrity Duets, the international charity program, in its Arabic version and the program “Heik Menghanni”  alongside Maya Diab and also the program “Ta’a Nensa” with the host Tony Baroud on MTV Lebanon, in addition to her performance at the biggest sporting event world wide_ the FIFA World Cup Qatar 2022.

Discography 
 T’en vas pas (August 2014), a French song that was shot in Guadeloupe – France
 Goza la vida (July 2016), a Spanish song
 Saa’a Nattarni/La Espera (January 2017), a Ziad Rahbani song that she performed in Arabic and Spanish
 Natarni/Me Hizo Esperar (July 2017), an Elias Rahbani song that she performed in Arabic and Spanish 
 Yalla Tayerni (August 2017)
 3 daqat Remix (December 2017)
 Ya Wahechni (August 2018)
 Min Ghayrak (June 2019)
 Shouf (February 2022)  
 BAMBI (June 2022)

References 

1986 births
Living people
Lebanese people of French descent
Lebanese female dancers
21st-century Lebanese women singers